Kugarchinsky District is an administrative and municipal district (raion), one of the fifty-four in the Republic of Bashkortostan, Russia. It is located in the southwest of the republic and borders Meleuzovsky District in the north, Burzyansky District in the northeast, Zilairsky District in the east, Zianchurinsky District in the south, Orenburg Oblast in the southwest, and Kuyurgazinsky District in the west. Its administrative center is the rural locality (a selo) of Mrakovo. As of the 2010 Census, the total population of the district was 31,444, with the population of Mrakovo accounting for 27.6% of that number.

History
The district was established on August 20, 1930.

Administrative and municipal status
Within the framework of administrative divisions, Kugarchinsky District is one of the fifty-four in the Republic of Bashkortostan. The district is divided into 20 selsoviets, comprising 113 rural localities. As a municipal division, the district is incorporated as Kugarchinsky Municipal District. Its twenty selsoviets are incorporated as twenty rural settlements within the municipal district. The selo of Mrakovo serves as the administrative center of both the administrative and municipal district.

Notable people
Murtaza Rakhimov (b. 1934), first President of the Republic of Bashkortostan

References

Notes

Sources

Districts of Bashkortostan
States and territories established in 1930